Ramón Martínez de Paz (born February 10, 1981, in Usulután, El Salvador) is a Salvadoran professional footballer.

Club career
Martínez played 9 years for Chalatenango.

In the grand final of the Apertura 2015 tournament, Martínez scored the only goal of the game against FAS (1–0) giving victory to his team Alianza and also the national championship.

References

1981 births
Living people
People from Usulután Department
Association football central defenders
Salvadoran footballers
C.D. Chalatenango footballers